Skënder Temali (30 July 1946 – April 17, 2021) was an Albanian writer, poet and journalist.

Life
After earning a degree from the Luigj Gurakuqi University of Shkodër, Albanian literature and language, Temali worked for many years on local and national radio stations and in Radio Shkodra. Currently, Temali is a teacher in a Shkodër high school.

He started to write poetry, novels, and short stories since he was in high school and won several national and international awards. In later years, Temali was also the editor for new generation writers.

His 12th and publication came in 2009 and was called Lirika të hershme dhe të vona (Early and late lyrics).

References

External links
 Personal website

1946 births
2021 deaths
Albanian-language writers
Albanian journalists
People from Shkodër
Albanian schoolteachers
Male journalists
20th-century Albanian poets
21st-century Albanian poets
Albanian-language poets
Albanian male writers
21st-century Albanian writers
Albanian male poets
Albanian novelists
Male novelists
20th-century novelists
21st-century novelists
Albanian male short story writers
Albanian short story writers
20th-century short story writers
21st-century short story writers
20th-century male writers
21st-century male writers